Maria Gretzer (born 11 November 1958) is a Swedish equestrian. She competed at the 1992 Summer Olympics, the 1996 Summer Olympics and the 2000 Summer Olympics.

References

External links
 

1958 births
Living people
Swedish female equestrians
Olympic equestrians of Sweden
Equestrians at the 1992 Summer Olympics
Equestrians at the 1996 Summer Olympics
Equestrians at the 2000 Summer Olympics
Sportspeople from Örebro